Dean Trevor Busby (born 1 February 1973) is an English former professional rugby league footballer who played in the 1990s and 2000s.

Background
Dean Busby was born in Hull, East Riding of Yorkshire, England.

Playing career

International honours
Dean Busby won 8-caps for Great Britain Under-21s, 1-cap for England against Wales in 1992, and won caps for Wales while at Hull in 1998 against England, while at Warrington in 2000 against South Africa, in the 2000 Rugby League World Cup against Cook Islands, Lebanon, and Papua New Guinea, and in 2001 against England.

Dean Busby played for Wales in the 1995 Rugby League World Cup, and the 2000 Rugby League World Cup.

Premiership Final appearances
Dean Busby played  in Hull FC's 14-4 victory over Widnes in the 1990–91 Premiership Final during the 1990–91 season at Old Trafford, Manchester on Sunday 12 May 1991.

Super league appearances
Dean Busby played during St. Helens' victory in 1996's Super League I.

Challenge Cup Final appearances
Dean Busby did not play in St. Helens' 40-32 victory over Bradford Bulls in the 1996 Challenge Cup Final during Super League I at Wembley Stadium, London on Saturday 26 April 1996.

Regal Trophy Final appearances
Dean Busby played  in St. Helens' 16-25 defeat by Wigan in the 1995–96 Regal Trophy Final during the 1995–96 at Alfred McAlpine Stadium, Huddersfield on Saturday 13 January 1996.

Club career
Dean Busby made his début for the Warrington Wolves on Sunday 14 February 1999, and he played his last match for the Warrington Wolves on Sunday 8 September 2002.

References

External links
Profile at saints.org.uk
Warrington's World Cup heroes – Dean Busby
Statistics at wolvesplayers.thisiswarrington.co.uk
Seatch for "Dean Busby" AND "Rugby League" at BBC – Sport
Wolves' finale leaves Sox reeling
Wales wait on forward duo
Wolves release international duo
Beware the rampaging Bulls
Kumuls unchanged for Wales
Kangaroos eyeing final
Wales looking good
Sullivan pleased with warm-up win
Griffiths predicts Cunningham's return
Harris named in Wales squad
 (archived by web.archive.org) Stats – Past Players – B at hullfc.com
 (archived by web.archive.org) Statistics at hullfc.com

1973 births
Living people
England national rugby league team players
English rugby league players
Hull F.C. players
Hull Kingston Rovers players
Rugby league locks
Rugby league props
Rugby league second-rows
Rugby league players from Kingston upon Hull
St Helens R.F.C. players
Wales national rugby league team players
Warrington Wolves players